Proteasome-associated protein ECM29 homolog is a protein that in humans is encoded by the KIAA0368 gene.

References

Further reading